Robert Asencio (born August 1963) is an American Democratic politician and former Miami-Dade Schools Police Department captain from Florida. From 2016 to 2018, Asencio served in the Florida House of Representatives, representing part of Miami-Dade in District 118. In August 2022, he won the Democratic primary for the newly created Florida's 28th congressional district in the United States House of Representatives, and will face incumbent Republican Carlos A. Giménez in the November general election.

History 
Asencio was born in Brooklyn, New York, in 1963. Asencio graduated from St. Thomas University with a BA in 2009. Asencio served in the United States Army Reserve and later went on to become a police captain.

Florida House of Representatives 
Asencio defeated Republican David Rivera in the Florida House of Representatives District 118 general election after running unopposed in the Democratic primary. He succeeded Frank Artiles. He sits on the Education Committee and on the Health Quality, Justice Appropriations, Post-Secondary Education, and PreK-12 Innovation subcommittees.

See also 
 Florida House of Representatives
 List of people from Brooklyn

References

External links 

 Robert Asencio for Congress campaign website

1963 births
Candidates in the 2022 United States House of Representatives elections
Living people
Democratic Party members of the Florida House of Representatives
Politicians from Brooklyn
St. Thomas University (Florida) alumni
United States Army reservists